The former French Catholic diocese of Apt, in southeast France, existed from the fourth century until the French Revolution. By the Concordat of 1801, it was suppressed, and its territory was divided between the diocese of Digne and the diocese of Avignon. Its seat was at Apt Cathedral, in Vaucluse.

History

The Chapter of the Cathedral of Apt was founded on 4 August 991 by Bishop Teudericus, in consultation with Prince Guillaume of Provence, Archbishop Annone of Arles, Archbishop Amalric of Aix, and Bishop Ingilram of Cavaillon, out of the clerics who served the cathedral. The original charter establishes a corporation composed of a Provost and twelve canons. By March 1247, dignities of the chapter are named in addition to the Provost: the Archdeacon, the Sacristan, the Precentor, and the Operarius.

In 1790 the National Constituent Assembly conceived a plan to destroy the influence of the Estates throughout France and bring the whole country under central administration. This was to be done by the creation of some 83 or 84 'départements'. At the same time the Church was to be brought into subordination by abolishing the old ecclesiastical diocesan system and creating new dioceses which would have the same boundaries as the departments.  The plan made more than fifty of the 135 Catholic dioceses in France redundant. The details were enacted by the Legislative Assembly, under the Civil Constitution of the Clergy (1790).  The diocese of Apt was one of the dioceses which were declared redundant and were suppressed. The abolition of Catholic dioceses was a violation of Canon Law, and the requirement that the clergy were to be obliged to take an oath to the Constitution in order to hold their jobs and collect their state-supplied salaries brought about a schism. New bishops and priests under the Constitutional system were to be elected by special 'Electors' in each department, who did not need to be Catholics or even Christians. That too was uncanonical and schismatic. The vows of monks and nuns were abolished by the National Assembly, and their property was seized by the State.

In 1801 First Consul Napoleon Bonaparte was preparing to end the religious confusion in France by entering into a Concordat with the Vatican. He had plans for the future, and he required a united France in order to carry them out successfully. In separate actions both he and Pius VII called on all bishops in France to submit their resignations. On November 29, 1801, by the bull Qui Christi Domini, Pope Pius VII suppressed all of the Roman Catholic dioceses in France, and immediately reinstituted them under papal authority. This act did away with whatever doubt or ambiguity might still exist as to a 'Constitutional Church' and 'Constitutional dioceses' in France. Apt was not one of the dioceses that was restored.

The name of the diocese was revived, however, by Pope Benedict XVI in January 2009, as a titular see for bishops who have no diocese of their own.

Bishops

to 1100

 96–102?: Auspice
 [260?: Leonius]
 [394: Octavius]
 400–410?: Quentin
 410–423?: Castor
 431?–436: Auxonius
 439–442: Julius
 517–545: Pretextatus
 [546: Eusebius]
 549–573: Clementinus
 581–585: Pappus
 614: Innocentius
 788: Magneric
 853: Trutbertus
 867: Paul (I.)
 879: Richard
 885: Sendard
 887: Paul (II.)
 c. 951 – c. 955: Rostan
 c. 960 – 964: Arnulf
 c. 965 – c. 984: Nartold
 989–998: Theodoric
 999–1110?: Ilbogus
 1010–1046: Stephanus
 [1046?: Laugier I.]
 c. 1048 – c. 1080: Alphant
 1095?–1099?: Isoard

from 1100 to 1500

 [1102?: Bertrand]
 1103–1143: Laugier II. d'Agout
 1145–1151: Raimond
 1158–1162: Guillaume (I.)
 1162–1182: Pierre de Saint-Paul
 1186–1193: Guiran de Viens 
 1208–1221: Godefredus I.
 1221–1243: Godefredus II.
 1243–1246: Guillaume Centullion
 1246–1256: Geofroi Dalmas
 1256–1268: Pierre Baile
 1268–1272: Ripert de Viens
 1272–1275: Raimond Centullion
 1275–1303: Raimond Bot
 1303–1319: Hugues Bot
 1319–1330: Raimond Bot (II.)
 1330–1331: Guiraud de Languissel
 1331–1332: Bertrand Acciaioli
 1332–1336: Guillaume d'Astre
 1336–1341: Guillaume Audibert
 1341–1342: Guillaume Amici
 1342–1348: Arnaud
 1348–1358: Bertrand de Meissenier
 1358–1361: Elzéar de Pontevès, O.F.M.
 1362–1383: Raimond Savini
 1383–1390: Géraud du Breuil (Avignon Obedience)
 1390–1410: Jean Fillet (Avignon Obedience)
 1411–1412: Pierre Perricaud, O.P. 
 1412–1430: Constantinus de Pergola
 1430–1437: Étienne d'Épernay, O.P.
 1438–1466: Pierre Nasondi
 1467–1482: Jean d'Ortigue
 1482–1489: Agricol de Panisse
 1490–1494: Jean Chabrol

from 1500 to 1800

 1494–1515: Jean de Montaigu
 1515–1533: Jean de Nicolaï
 1533–1540: César Trivulce
 1540–1559: Pierre de Forli
 1560–1571: Baptiste de Simiane
 1571–1582: François de Simiane, O.Cist.
 1588–1607: Pompée de Periglio
 1607–1628: Jean Pélissier, O.S.B.
 1629–1670: Modeste de Villeneuve, O.F.M.Observ.
 1671–1695: Jean de Gaillard
 1696–1723: Ignace de Foresta
 1723–1751: Jean-Baptiste de Vaccon
 1752–1778: Félicien de la Merlière
 1778–1801: Laurent Éon de Cély

Titular Bishops of Apt
 2009-current: Jean-Luc Hudsyn (Auxiliary Bishop of Mechelen-Brussel)

See also
Catholic Church in France
List of Catholic dioceses in France

Notes

Bibliography

Reference works

  (Use with caution; obsolete)
  (in Latin) 
 (in Latin)

Studies

Former Roman Catholic dioceses in France
Dioceses established in the 4th century
4th-century establishments in Roman Gaul
1801 disestablishments in France